Christopher Pang (born 29 December 1984) is an Australian actor and producer. He is best known for his role as Colin Khoo in Crazy Rich Asians (2018) and Lee Takkam in Tomorrow, When the War Began (2010).

Early life
Pang was born in Melbourne and is the son of Wing Chun instructors. His paternal grandparents are from Canton, China while his father, Barry Pang, was born and raised in Australia. His mother, Anne Pang, was born in Taiwan and migrated to Australia in the 1970s.  He was educated at Scotch College.

Pang is distantly related to Bruce Lee as Lee's father was a cousin of Pang's paternal grandmother, and both came from the same village in Canton. Through his mother Anne Pang, Pang is a descendant of Wong Nai Siong, the Chinese revolutionary leader, Christian reformer and humanitarian who was key in the Fujian province in overthrowing the propaganda machine of the late Qing dynasty.

He later enrolled in a university and majored in multimedia studies. Unsatisfied with his studies, he later took a year off and sold phones to businesses before going into acting.

Pang is fluent in Mandarin and Cantonese. He currently lives in Los Angeles.

Career 
While selling phones, Pang began his career incidentally after walking into a casting agency who were looking for a performer to do a Chinese accent for a voice over, Pang booked the role dubbing as Jackie Chan's brother in New Police Story 4. This started his acting career. Shortly afterwards he began studying at TAFTA in Melbourne.

He temporarily moved to Beijing and Hong Kong to pursue an acting career. His big break would come in 2010, booking one of the lead roles in Australian film adaptation of the young adult dystopian novel Tomorrow, When the War Began and would star opposite Caitlin Stasey, the film was a box office success in Australia. Later he acted in the feature film Citizen Jia Li.

Despite the success of Tomorrow, he received little traction and in 2013 moved to Hollywood to further pursue his acting career. He reunited with his Tomorrow co-star Caitlin Stasey in I, Frankenstein. In 2016, he appeared in the martial arts film Crouching Tiger, Hidden Dragon: Sword of Destiny, in which he played the character Flying Blade. He also recurred in the season two of drama series Marco Polo.

In 2018, he co-starred in the film adaptation Crazy Rich Asians, directed by Jon M. Chu and starring Constance Wu, Michelle Yeoh and Henry Golding. He portrayed Colin Khoo. He later produced and starred in the Manila-set independent film Empty by Design alongside Osric Chau and Filipina actress Rhian Ramos. Empty by Design was his first feature film as a producer.

Pang co-starred in the 2019 reboot and continuation of Charlie's Angels, directed by Elizabeth Banks. In June 2019, he was cast in a Jason Katims pilot for Amazon Studios. He also joined the cast of Palm Springs.

Filmography

Film

Television

Awards
Asians On Film "Best Actor", 2013
GQ "Breakout star of the year", 2019

References

External links 
 
 

Male actors from Melbourne
Living people
21st-century Australian male actors
Australian male film actors
Australian male television actors
Australian people of Chinese descent
Australian people of Taiwanese descent
1984 births